Dragan Stojisavljević (Serbian Cyrillic: Драган Стојисављевић; born 6 January 1974) is a Serbian former professional footballer who played as a winger.

Club career
After starting out with his hometown club Vrbas, Stojisavljević went on to play for Hajduk Kula and Partizan in the First League of FR Yugoslavia. 

Between February 2000-2001 and June 2003-July 2004, Stojisavljević played for FC Seoul (then known as Anyang LG Cheetahs). 

July 2004-2004, he played for Incheon United.

He also played for his former club Hajduk Kula from early 2002 to mid-2003 (an 18-month spell).

Career statistics

 FC Seoul
2000–2001: League 36 matches-6 goals / League Cup: 12 matches-0 goal
June 2003–July 2004: League 18 matches-5 goals / League Cup: None

 Incheon United
July 2004–2004: League: None / League Cup 4 matches-0 goal

Honours
Partizan
 First League of FR Yugoslavia: 1998–99
 FR Yugoslavia Cup: 1997–98
Anyang LG Cheetahs
 K League: 2000
 Korean Super Cup: 2001

References

External links
 
 

Association football midfielders
Association football wingers
Expatriate footballers in South Korea
FC Seoul players
First League of Serbia and Montenegro players
FK Hajduk Kula players
FK Partizan players
FK Vrbas players
Incheon United FC players
K League 1 players
People from Vrbas, Serbia
Serbia and Montenegro expatriate footballers
Serbia and Montenegro footballers
Serbia and Montenegro expatriate sportspeople in South Korea
Serbian footballers
1974 births
Living people